The COVID-19 pandemic was confirmed to have spread to the Canary Islands on 31 January 2020, when a German tourist was tested positive in La Gomera. The second confirmed case of the disease in the islands was found on 24 February, following the outbreak in Italy, when a medical doctor from Lombardy, Italy who was vacationing in Tenerife was tested positive for the disease. Afterwards, multiple cases were detected in Tenerife involving people who had come into contact with the same doctor.

References 

Canary
Canary
Disease outbreaks in the Canary Islands